Flashy Python is a project by Alec Ounsworth of Clap Your Hands Say Yeah.  Their debut album, Skin and Bones, was self-released in 2009.

History 

Skin and Bones was released on August 11, 2009, to absolutely no pre-release press. It spontaneously showed up on the Flashy Python official website available for streaming of the entire album and also purchasing details for those who wanted to download the album in high-quality mp3, or buy a physical copy on CD or Vinyl.

Members 
 Alec Ounsworth of Clap Your Hands Say Yeah
 Toby Leaman of Dr. Dog
 Scott McMicken of Dr. Dog
 Matt Barrick of The Walkmen
 Billy Dufala of Man Man
Matt Sutton

Discography

Albums 
2009: Skin and Bones

References

External links 

 Official sites
Flashy Python official website

Musical groups from Philadelphia
Indie rock musical groups from Pennsylvania